Chelhar is a settlement in the Tharparkar district of Sindh province, southeastern Pakistan. It is located 30 km east north of Mithi and 60 km south from Umerkot. It is west of Chachro. Its name derives from the name of a man named Chela Charan, who was the owner of a well. Chelhar is famous for Ranasar. Bhujia & Batia (perha) are the great soogat of this city. It has a mandir named Murlidhar mandir located in the central area of the city, near the ૐ chowk. There is an annual fair of Dada Rampir held at Chelhar usually in the month of September.

Its population is about 20,000. The majority of its people are in the Menghwar community, and it has people of many castes including the Maheshwari. Other communities living in Chelhar include the Maharaj, Bheel, Suthar, Goswami, Bajeer, and Kumbhar. Hindus comprise the majority of its population. Maheshwari community is main business holder of the town.

Populated places in Tharparkar District